Thomas Lewis Colley (August 21, 1953 – November 17, 2021) was a Canadian professional ice hockey centre. He played one game in the National Hockey League, with the Minnesota North Stars on March 12, 1975. The rest of his career, which lasted from 1973 to 1986, was spent in the minor leagues. Colley's son, Kevin, also played in the NHL.

Playing career
As a youth, Colley played in the 1966 Quebec International Pee-Wee Hockey Tournament with the Toronto Weston minor ice hockey team.

Born in Toronto, Ontario, Colley played junior hockey for the Niagara Falls Flyers and the Sudbury Wolves, scoring 117 points including 81 assists. Colley was drafted 57th overall by the Minnesota North Stars in the 1973 NHL Amateur Draft and 38th overall by the New England Whalers in the 1973 WHA Amateur Draft. Like most WHA draftees, Colley chose to report to the NHL and signed with the North Stars, playing one game for the North Stars during the 1974-75 NHL season. He was assigned to the New Haven Nighthawks of the American Hockey League and spent a total of seven seasons with the team, helping them to two division titles in 1979 and 1980 as well as the regular season title in 1980. He also made the Calder Cup finals three times with the Nighthawks, in 1975 losing to the Springfield Indians and in 1978 and 1979, losing to the Maine Mariners on both occasions. He is the Nighthawks' all-time leader in goals (204), assists (281), points (485) and games (534).

In 1980, Colley spent a season with the Binghamton Whalers before spending the next five seasons playing senior hockey for the Collingwood Royals.  He retired as a player in 1986. Colley died on November 17, 2021.

Career statistics

Regular season and playoffs

See also
 List of players who played only one game in the NHL

References

External links
 

1953 births
2021 deaths
Binghamton Whalers players
Canadian ice hockey centres
Minnesota North Stars draft picks
Minnesota North Stars players
New England Whalers draft picks
New Haven Nighthawks players
Niagara Falls Flyers players
Ice hockey people from Toronto
Sudbury Wolves players